Denis Sergeyevich Terentyev (born 13 August 1992) is a Russian professional football player. He plays as a right-back for FC Rostov.

Club career
He made his Russian Premier League debut for FC Zenit Saint Petersburg on 13 May 2012 in a game against FC Anzhi Makhachkala.

On 5 June 2017, he returned from FC Rostov to FC Zenit Saint Petersburg, signing a 3-year contract.

On 2 September 2019, he extended his Zenit contract for another year and was loaned to FC Ufa for the remainder of the 2019–20 season.

On 15 October 2020 he returned to FC Rostov.

Honours
Zenit Saint Petersburg
 Russian Premier League: 2019–20, 2020–21

Career statistics

References

External links
 
 

1992 births
Footballers from Saint Petersburg
Living people
Russian footballers
Russia youth international footballers
Association football defenders
FC Zenit Saint Petersburg players
FC Tom Tomsk players
FC Zenit-2 Saint Petersburg players
FC Rostov players
FC Ufa players
Russian Premier League players
Russian First League players
Russian Second League players